The Buddha Statue of Hyderabad is a monolith located in India. It is the world's tallest monolith of Gautama Buddha, erected on Gibraltar Rock in the middle of Hussain Sagar.

History
Hyderabad is the capital of the state of Telangana (separated from Andhra Pradesh on 2 June 2014). Between 1983 and 1989, N. T. Rama Rao served as the Chief Minister of Andhra Pradesh. During his tenure, he spent large sums to erect several statues of people from the region's political and religious history. During his visit to New York, he saw the Statue of Liberty and was inspired by the efforts to restore it. He said "I wanted something like that great place to visit... That would have been my contribution to society."

Rama Rao chose to depict Gautama Buddha because "he was a humanitarian who told the whole truth to the people. It is our pride." After a long search, he found a solid white granite rock near Raigiri, Bhuvanagiri (Yadadri Bhuvanagiri district) on a mountainside 46 km outside Hyderabad. In October 1985 NTR inaugurated work on structure. For over a year, hundreds of labourers helped the temple architect and builder S.M.Ganapathi Sthapati create the statue. The roads of the city were also widened for this purpose.

This statue is located at Lumbini Park in the Hussain Sagar Island can be reached by boat in 15 minutes. The statue is near to Lakdi-Ka-Pul, Khairatabad and Assembly Hyderabad metro stations.

The accident
Then government of Andhra Pradesh led by N. T. Rama Rao was ousted in 1989. By the next year, the statue was ready for erection. ABC Limited, a local company, was given the responsibility of transferring the statue onto the concrete platform. Using a trailer vehicle, the statue was brought to the shore of Hussain Sagar. On 10 March 1990, company workers shifted the statue on top of a barge. After traveling only , the statue tipped and fell into the lake. The accident killed 10 people.

After a two-year salvage operation, the statue was pulled out of the lake. On 1 December 1992, the statue was installed on the platform successfully. In 2006, the Dalai Lama consecrated the statue after performing a ritual.

See also
 Statue of Ahimsa
 List of tallest statues

Gallery

References

 Shifting Stones, Shaping the Past: Sculpture from the Buddhist Stupas of Andhra Pradesh - Book

1992 establishments in Andhra Pradesh
1992 sculptures
Buddha statues in India
Buildings and structures in Hyderabad, India
Colossal Buddha statues
Colossal statues in India
Stone Buddha statues
Tourist attractions in Hyderabad, India